Department Of Commerce And Management Studies may refer to:
 a department in Indian Institute of Management Kozhikode
 a department in University of Calicut, Malappuram, India
 a department in Andhra University
 former name of Faculty of Management and Finance, University of Colombo